Ruth Delois Peterson is an American sociologist and criminologist known for her work on racial and ethnic inequality and crime. She earned her PhD in sociology from University of Wisconsin–Madison in 1983. Peterson is emerita professor of sociology at the Ohio State University, former director of the Criminal Justice Research Center (1999-2011), and former president of the American Society of Criminology (2016). She is the namesake of the American Society of Criminology's Ruth D. Peterson Fellowship for Racial and Ethnic Diversity.

Peterson is the co-organizer of the Racial Democracy, Crime, and Justice Network's Crime and Justice program, an annual Summer Research Institute to support research in criminal justice and crime by underrepresented groups.

References

Living people
University of Wisconsin–Madison College of Letters and Science alumni
Ohio State University faculty
American women sociologists
American criminologists
Presidents of the American Society of Criminology
American women criminologists
Year of birth missing (living people)
21st-century American women